The 1868 United States presidential election in California was held on November 3, 1868 as part of the 1868 United States presidential election. State voters chose five representatives, or electors, to the Electoral College, who voted for president and vice president. 

California narrowly voted for the Republican nominee, Union general Ulysses S. Grant, over the Democratic nominee, DNC chair Horatio Seymour by a margin barely over 500 votes. Additionally, this was the last time until 1968 where a Republican won the white House without carrying Santa Clara County.

Results

References

California
1868
1868 California elections